Albert E. DeVormer (August 19, 1891 – August 29, 1966) was an American professional baseball player. He played as a backup catcher in Major League Baseball for the Chicago White Sox, New York Yankees, Boston Red Sox, and New York Giants. DeVormer batted and threw right-handed. He was born in Grand Rapids, Michigan.

In a five-season career, he hit .258 with two home runs and 57 RBI.

Devormer died in Grand Rapids, Michigan, at age 75.

External links

1891 births
1966 deaths
Major League Baseball catchers
Chicago White Sox players
New York Yankees players
Boston Red Sox players
New York Giants (NL) players
Minor league baseball managers
Grand Rapids Black Sox players
Vernon Tigers players
Los Angeles Angels (minor league) players
Mobile Bears players
Louisville Colonels (minor league) players
Toledo Mud Hens players
Baseball players from Grand Rapids, Michigan
Sportspeople from Grand Rapids, Michigan